DC Comics is one of the largest comic book publishers in North America. DC has published comic books under a number of different imprints and corporate names. This is a list of all series, mini-series, limited series, one-shots and graphic novels published under the imprints DC or AA, and published by National Periodical Publications, National Comics Publications, All-American Comics, Inc., National Allied Publications, Detective Comics, Inc., and related corporate names, as well as imprints publishing titles directly related to the DC Universe characters and continuity, such as Elseworlds and DC Black Label. The list does not include collected editions; trade paperbacks; digital comics; free, promotional giveaways; or magazines, nor does it include series from imprints mainly publishing titles that are separate from the DC Universe continuity, such as Vertigo or WildStorm; series published under those imprints that are related to the DC Universe continuity are noted, but not listed.

While generally the most recognizable name of a comic is printed on the cover, the cover title can be changed for a number of reasons. For example, Action Comics has frequently been listed as Action Comics featuring Superman or Superman in Action Comics, or even on occasion Supergirl in Action Comics. The official name, however, is found in the indicia, in small print inside the comics.

List of DC Comics publications (A–B)
List of DC Comics publications (C–F)
List of DC Comics publications (G–J)
List of DC Comics publications (P–S)
List of DC Comics publications (T–Z)

K

L

M

N

O

See also
 List of current DC Comics publications
 List of DC Comics reprint collections
 List of DC Archive Editions
 List of DC Comics imprint publications
 List of Elseworlds publications
 List of DC Comics characters

DC Comics has also published titles under other imprints (chiefly Vertigo, Milestone, WildStorm, ABC, Paradox Press, Amalgam, DC Focus, Johnny DC, Tangent, CMX, Impact, Helix, Minx, and Homage) along with a number of reprints.

References

External links

DC Comics at the Big Comic Book Database

 K